Allen Nilan (1 April 1913 – 10 October 1994) was an Australian rules footballer who played for the Fitzroy Football Club in the Victorian Football League (VFL).

Notes

External links 
		

1913 births
1994 deaths
Australian rules footballers from Victoria (Australia)
Fitzroy Football Club players
University Blues Football Club players